Mike Barten (born 20 November 1973) is a German football coach and a former player. He is the manager of Hannover 96 II.

Managerial career

Early career
In 2008, Barten worked as head coach for FC Oberneuland.

In June 2012, it was announced he would manage lower league side TSV Blau-Weiß Melchiorshausen in the 2012–13 season. He remained at the club till 2014.

Hannover 96
From 2014 to 2016, Barten was youth coach at Hannover 96. In 2016, he became assistant coach to manager Daniel Stendel at the club. He works as youth coach for Hannover 96.

Honours
Werder Bremen
 DFB-Pokal: 1998–99; runner-up 1999–2000
 DFB-Ligapokal: runner-up 1999

References

External links
 

Living people
1973 births
Sportspeople from Lübeck
Association football defenders
German footballers
Footballers from Schleswig-Holstein
Bundesliga players
2. Bundesliga players
SV Werder Bremen players
SV Werder Bremen II players
FC Erzgebirge Aue players
SV Wilhelmshaven players
FC Oberneuland players
German football managers
FC Oberneuland managers
West German footballers